Gerald Drexler Garston (May 4, 1925 - April 5, 1994) was an American painter and printmaker who lived in Connecticut. Garston is known for his works of sports figures, geometric shapes, and mythical paintings animals.

Education
 Studied at Johns Hopkins University, Baltimore, Maryland
 Student of painter/sculptor Karl Metzler, Baltimore, Maryland, USA
 Student of printer Louis Boucher and printmaker Harry Sternberg, Arts Student League, New York, New York
 Student of Josef Albers, Yale University, New Haven, Connecticut

Exhibitions
Gartson's exhibitions include numerous solo and group exhibitions at locations including New York, Boston, and Connecticut. His best-known work, "Pastime," which depicts a baseball player holding an American flag, was the centerpiece of "Diamonds are Forever," the Smithsonian Institution's traveling exhibition of baseball art.

Museum collections
 DeCordova Museum, Lincoln, Massachusetts
 Fogg Museum, Harvard University, Cambridge, Massachusetts 
 Los Angeles County Museum, Los Angeles, California 
 Philadelphia Museum of Art, Philadelphia, Pennsylvania
 Rose Museum, Brandeis University, Waltham, Massachusetts 
 Wadsworth Athenaeum, Hartford, Connecticut
 William Rockhill Nelson Gallery of Art, Kansas City, Missouri

Publications
A Monograph, The Art of Gerald Garston: A Good Life in Your Eyes with an essay by: Alicia Currier Kallay, Foreword by: Bud Collins was published in 2005

References

1925 births
1994 deaths
Painters from Connecticut
20th-century American painters
American male painters
Johns Hopkins University alumni
20th-century American printmakers
20th-century American male artists